In algebra, the dual numbers are a hypercomplex number system first introduced in the 19th century.

Dual numbers can be added component-wise, and multiplied by the formula
 
which follows from the property  and the fact that multiplication is a bilinear operation.

The dual numbers form a commutative algebra of dimension two over the reals, and also an Artinian local ring. They are one of the simplest examples of a ring that has nonzero nilpotent elements.

History
Dual numbers were introduced in 1873 by William Clifford, and were used at the beginning of the twentieth century by the German mathematician Eduard Study, who used them to represent the dual angle which measures the relative position of two skew lines in space. The -dimensional generalization, the Grassmann number, was introduced by Hermann Grassmann in the late 19th century.

Definition in abstract algebra

In abstract algebra, the algebra of dual numbers is often defined as the quotient of a polynomial ring over the real numbers  by the principal ideal generated by the square of the indeterminate, that is

Matrix representation

The dual number  can be represented by the square matrix . In this representation the matrix  squares to the zero matrix, corresponding to the dual number .

There are other ways to represent dual numbers as square matrices.
 
with

Differentiation
One application of dual numbers is automatic differentiation. Consider the real dual numbers above. Given any real polynomial , it is straightforward to extend the domain of this polynomial from the reals to the dual numbers. Then we have this result:
 

More generally, we can extend any (analytic) real function to the dual numbers by looking at its Taylor series:

 

A similar method works for polynomials of  variables, using the exterior algebra of an -dimensional vector space.

Geometry
The "unit circle" of dual numbers consists of those with  since these satisfy  where . However, note that
 
so the exponential map applied to the -axis covers only half the "circle".

Let . The concept of a rotation in the dual number plane is equivalent to a vertical shear mapping since .

In absolute space and time the Galilean transformation

that is

relates the resting coordinates system to a moving frame of reference of velocity .

Cycles
The "cyclic rotation" of the dual number plane occurs as a motion of its projective line. According to Isaak Yaglom, the cycle  is invariant under the composition of the shear

with the translation

Division
Division of dual numbers is defined when the real part of the denominator is non-zero. The division process is analogous to complex division in that the denominator is multiplied by its conjugate in order to cancel the non-real parts.

Therefore, to divide an equation of the form

we multiply the top and bottom by the conjugate of the denominator:

which is defined when  is non-zero.

If, on the other hand,  is zero while  is not, then the equation

 has no solution if  is nonzero
 is otherwise solved by any dual number of the form .
This means that the non-real part of the "quotient" is arbitrary and division is therefore not defined for purely nonreal dual numbers. Indeed, they are (trivially) zero divisors and clearly form an ideal of the associative algebra (and thus ring) of the dual numbers.

Applications in mechanics
Dual numbers find applications in mechanics, notably for kinematic synthesis. For example, the dual numbers make it possible to transform the input/output equations of a four-bar spherical linkage, which includes only rotoid joints, into a four-bar spatial mechanism (rotoid, rotoid, rotoid, cylindrical). The dualized angles are made of a primitive part, the angles, and a dual part, which has units of length. See screw theory for more.

Generalizations

Arbitrary module of elements of zero square 
There is a more general construction of the dual numbers. Given a commutative ring  and a module , there is a ring  called the ring of dual numbers which has the following structures:

The algebra of dual numbers is the special case where  and

Superspace
Dual numbers find applications in physics, where they constitute one of the simplest non-trivial examples of a superspace. Equivalently, they are supernumbers with just one generator; supernumbers generalize the concept to  distinct generators , each anti-commuting, possibly taking  to infinity. Superspace generalizes supernumbers slightly, by allowing multiple commuting dimensions.

The motivation for introducing dual numbers into physics follows from the Pauli exclusion principle for  fermions. The direction along  is termed the "fermionic" direction, and the real component is termed the "bosonic" direction. The fermionic direction earns this name from the fact that fermions obey the Pauli exclusion principle: under the exchange of coordinates, the quantum mechanical wave function changes sign, and thus vanishes if two coordinates are brought together; this physical idea is captured by the algebraic relation .

Projective line
The idea of a projective line over dual numbers was advanced by Grünwald and Corrado Segre.

Just as the Riemann sphere needs a north pole point at infinity to close up the complex projective line, so a line at infinity succeeds in closing up the plane of dual numbers to a cylinder.

Let . This relation is in fact an equivalence relation. They are represented with projective coordinates .

Now take the opposite line on the cylinder for the axis of a pencil of planes. The planes intersecting the dual number plane and cylinder provide a correspondence of points between these surfaces. The plane parallel to the dual number plane corresponds to points ,  in the projective line over dual numbers.

See also
 Smooth infinitesimal analysis
 Perturbation theory
 Infinitesimal
 Screw theory
 Dual-complex number
 Laguerre transformations
 Grassmann number
 Automatic differentiation

References

Further reading

 From Cornell Historical Mathematical Monographs at Cornell University.

Linear algebra
Hypercomplex numbers
Commutative algebra
Differential algebra